Panellinios B.C. in international competitions is the history and statistics of Panellinios B.C. in FIBA Europe and Euroleague Basketball Company European-wide club basketball competitions.

European competitions

See also
 Greek basketball clubs in international competitions

External links
FIBA Europe
EuroLeague
ULEB
EuroCup

Panellinios
Greek basketball clubs in European and worldwide competitions